= Givi Badrishvili =

Georgian agronomist (born 1934)

Givi Badrishvili (Georgian: გივი ბადრიშვილი; September 12, 1934) is a Georgian agronomist. He is a Doctor of Agricultural Sciences (1986), and a member of the Academy of Agricultural Sciences.

In 1959 he graduated from the Georgian Research Institute of Horticulture, Viticulture and Wine-Making, and from 1976–1982 he was Deputy Director of the Research Institute for Science there. He was later a State Agricultural Technical Director, conducting much research into horticulture, viticulture and winemaking in Georgia. He explored ways to process fruit using production-intensive technology. He is now a director of the Georgian Research Institute of Horticulture, Viticulture and Wine-Making. Badrishvili has received several awards for his work.
